The 2018 Red Bull Air Race World Championship was the thirteenth Red Bull Air Race World Championship series.

Aircraft and pilots

Master Class

Pilot changes
 Peter Podlunšek retired the master class pilot of Red Bull Air Race following the final round of the 2017 season.
 2017 Challenger Class pilot of Red Bull Air Race Ben Murphy made his debut in the Master Class.

Challenger Class
 All Challenger Cup Pilots used a Zivko Edge 540 V2.

Pilot changes
 Italy's Dario Costa and South Africa's Patrick Davidson will make their debuts in the Challenger Class.

Race calendar and results 
The eight-event calendar for the 2018 season was announced on 8 November 2017. Chiba of rounds 3 were announced on 6 March 2018. On 24 July 2018, the season finale was announced to be held at the Texas Motor Speedway in Fort Worth, Texas.

Championship standings

Master Class
Master Class scoring system

Challenger Class
Challenger Class scoring system

References

External links
 

 
Red Bull Air Race World Championship seasons
Red Bull Air Race
Red Bull Air Race